The Hogarth Shakespeare project was an effort by Hogarth Press to retell works by William Shakespeare for a more modern audience. To do this, Hogarth commissioned well-known writers to select and re-imagine the plays.

Novels 
Authors and works – as of May 2018 – include:
 The Gap of Time by Jeanette Winterson – a retelling of The Winter's Tale
 Shylock is My Name by Howard Jacobson – an interpretation of The Merchant of Venice
 Vinegar Girl by Anne Tyler – a retelling of The Taming of the Shrew
 Hag-Seed by Margaret Atwood – a re-imagining of The Tempest
 Macbeth by Jo Nesbø – a retelling of Macbeth
 Dunbar by Edward St Aubyn – a retelling of King Lear
 New Boy by Tracy Chevalier – a re-imagining of Othello

Additionally, as far back as 2014, Gillian Flynn was supposed to be working on a re-telling of Hamlet, eventually due for release in 2021. but there is no longer a mention of this on the website of the publisher.

Development history 
In June 2013, Random House announced the Hogarth Shakespeare series, as part of which well-known novelists re-tell a selection of Shakespeare's plays. Hogarth intended to release the series in 2016 to coincide with the four-hundredth anniversary of Shakespeare's death.

The two re-tellings first announced in 2013 were Jeanette Winterson's The Winter's Tale adaptation and Anne Tyler's The Taming of the Shrew adaptation. Later that year, it was announced that Margaret Atwood and Howard Jacobson would join the series with The Tempest and The Merchant of Venice adaptations respectively. In 2014, it was announced that Jo Nesbø would adapt Macbeth, that Edward St Aubyn would adapt King Lear, that Tracy Chevalier would adapt Othello, and that Gillian Flynn would adapt Hamlet, although that last title has not been published.

The Hogarth Shakespeare series intends to reimagine the entire canon, but no other adaptations have been announced. Sometimes before March 2021, what was the official URL for the series (hogarthshakespeare.com) started to link to the site of an online magazine specialising in animes and mangas, called Anime Shakespeare, which, together with the lack of an announcement for a new title in over two years, seems to imply that the project has been quietly shut down by Hogarth/Penguin.

Awards and nominations 
Winterson's The Gap of Time was a finalist for the 2016 Lambda Literary Awards in the category Bisexual Fiction.

In 2017, Hag-Seed was long-listed for the Bailey's Women's Prize for Fiction.

Nesbø's Macbeth was shortlisted for the 2019 British Book Awards in the category Crime and Thriller. In 2019 it was also shortlisted for the Public Book Awards in Greece for Best Translated Novel and for the Swedish Academy of Crime Writers' Award for Best Translated Crime Novel.

References

External links

Modern adaptations of works by William Shakespeare
Hogarth Press books
Novels based on plays
Novels based on works by William Shakespeare